The 2017–19 Saudi Arabian purge was the mass arrest of a number of prominent Saudi Arabian princes, government ministers, and business people in Saudi Arabia on 4 November 2017 and the following few weeks after the creation of an anti-corruption committee led by Crown Prince Mohammed bin Salman.

There are three alternate hypotheses regarding the motives behind the purge: a genuine corruption crackdown, a project to gain money, or preparing to take over the crown.

The detainees were confined at the Ritz-Carlton hotel in Riyadh (which had hosted the announcement for the planned city of Neom on 24 October 2017), which subsequently stopped accepting new bookings and told guests to leave. Private jets were also grounded to prevent suspects from fleeing the country.

The arrests resulted in the final sidelining of the faction of King Abdullah, and Mohammed bin Salman's complete consolidation of control of all three branches of the security forces, making him the most powerful man in Saudi Arabia since his grandfather, the first King, Ibn Saud.

As many as 500 people were rounded up in the sweep. Saudi Arabian banks froze more than 2,000 domestic accounts as part of the crackdown. According to The Wall Street Journal, the Saudi government targeted cash and assets worth up to $800 billion. The Saudi authorities claimed that amount was composed of assets worth around $300 billion to $400 billion that they can prove was linked to corruption.

Attorney General Sheikh Saud Al Motjeb said in a statement that the arrests were "merely the start of a vital process to root out corruption wherever it exists." He added that those detained would have access to legal counsel and pledged to hold trials "in a timely and open manner." Meanwhile, King Salman appointed 26 new judges.

Mohammed bin Salman stated that "We show them all the files that we have, and as soon as they see those, about 95 percent agree to a settlement... About 1 percent are able to prove they are clean and their case is dropped right there. About 4 percent say they are not corrupt and with their lawyers want to go to court." When asked about reports of cash and assets totaling $800 billion that belong to the people accused of corruption, the official said, "Even if we get 100 billion back, that would be good."

The anti-corruption committee ended its mission on 30 January 2019, concluding that 381 individuals were apprehended, some of them were able to give their testimony, and $107 billion was recovered to the state treasury as a result. Many commentators claimed that the move appeared to end the structure of consensus-based governance in Saudi Arabia and may create strain within the Saudi royal family.

Allegations 
The allegations include money laundering, bribery, extorting officials, and taking advantage of public office for personal gain.

Tiger Squad 

The group members were recruited from different branches of the Saudi forces, directing several areas of expertise.

The Tiger Squad allegedly assassinates dissidents using varying covert methods, such as planned car and aircraft accidents, house fires, and poisoning at hospitals during routine health checkups. The five-member squad were also the part of the 15-member death squad who assassinated Jamal Khashoggi.

According to the sources, bin Salman chose silent murder instead of arrest as the method of repression due to the fact that only arresting the dissidents sparks international pressures for releasing them, whereas silent murder covers it up quietly. Prince Mansour bin Muqrin died when his personal aircraft crashed, although it was allegedly shot down as he tried to flee the country from the purge and then made to appear as an accident. Meshal Saad al-Bostani, a member of the Tiger Squad and a lieutenant in the Saudi airforce was allegedly behind the murder and he himself would die in a car accident in Riyadh while according to a Turkish news outlet he had actually been murdered by poison.

Another victim was Suliman Abdul Rahman al-Thuniyan, a Saudi court judge who was murdered by injection of a deadly virus when he visited a hospital for a regular health checkup. This took place after he had opposed bin Salman's 2030 Economic Vision.

Corruption 
King Salman stated that the anti-corruption committee need to "identify offences, crimes and persons and entities involved in cases of public corruption". He also referred to the "exploitation by some of the weak souls who have put their own interests above the public interest, in order to illicitly accrue money".

Extremism 
On 24 October 2017 Mohammad bin Salman who ordered the arrests, told investors in Riyadh that "We are returning to what we were before, a country of moderate Islam that is open to all religions and to the world". He also pledged to counter "extremism very soon".

List of involved people 

Those arrested, detained, sanctioned or removed from their posts include, but are not limited to:

Royals

Detained
Prince Al-Waleed bin Talal, billionaire businessman (Released 27 January 2018, according to Agence France-Presse)
Prince Fahd bin Abdullah, former deputy defense minister
Queen Fahda bint Falah, wife of King Salman and mother of Mohammad bin Salman himself. Under house arrest. She reappeared at public events from March 2020.
Prince Khaled bin Talal, brother of al-Waleed and businessman
Prince Mohammed bin Nayef, former Crown Prince of Saudi Arabia and former interior minister. Under house arrest.
Prince Mutaib bin Abdullah, former head of Saudi Arabian National Guard and son of King Abdullah. He is seen as the most powerful of those arrested.
Princess Reem bint al-Waleed bin Talal, daughter of al-Waleed bin Talal and businesswoman
Prince Turki bin Abdullah, another son of King Abdullah and former governor of Riyadh Province 
Prince Faisal bin Abdullah, former head of the Saudi Red Crescent Society and another son of King Abdullah.
Prince Mishaal bin Abdullah, a former governor of Mecca and Najran provinces and another son of King Abdullah
Prince Turki bin Nasser, former head of the presidency of meteorology and environment
 Prince Turki bin Mohammed bin Saud Al Kabeer, former advisor at royal court

Uncertain status
Prince Abdul Aziz bin Fahd, youngest son of King Fahd. There were rumors that Abdul Aziz, age 44, was killed while resisting arrest, but the Saudi information ministry released a statement saying that the prince was "alive and well."
Prince Mansour bin Muqrin, deputy governor of Asir and son of former Crown Prince Muqrin bin Abdulaziz. He was killed in a helicopter crash, though unconfirmed allegations have been made that his helicopter was shot down while he was attempting to flee the country.

Sanctioned
Prince Bandar bin Sultan, former Secretary General of the National Security Council and former head of the General Intelligence Presidency

Politicians

Detained
 Adel Fakeih, former Economy and Planning Minister
 Admiral Abdullah bin Sultan bin Mohammed Al-Sultan, Royal Saudi Navy Commander
 Ibrahim Abdulaziz Al-Assaf, former finance minister
 Khaled al-Tuwaijri, former head of royal court
 Mohammad al-Tobaishi, former head of protocol at the Royal Court

Military officers

Detained
 Abdullah Sultan, commander of the Saudi navy
 Ali Al Qahtani, major general in Saudi army. He died in custody.

Businessmen and professionals

Detained 
Abdulrahman Fakieh, businessman
Amr Al-Dabbagh, businessman, CEO of Al-Dabbagh Group (ADG)
Bakr bin Laden, chairman of the Saudi Binladin Group and half-brother of Osama bin Laden
Khalid Abdullah Almolhem, former head of Saudi Arabian Airlines
Loai Nazer, prominent businessman
Mansour al-Balawi, prominent businessman
Mohammed Hussein Al Amoudi, Ethio-Saudi billionaire businessman
Nasser Al Tayyar, businessman, non-executive board member Al Tayyar Travel Group
Saleh Abdullah Kamel, billionaire businessman, owner of Arab Radio and Television Network and founder of the Dallah al Baraka Group
Saoud al-Daweesh, former chief executive of Saudi Telecom Company
 Waleed bin Ibrahim Al Ibrahim, billionaire businessman, brother-in-law of King Fahd, Chairman of Middle East Broadcasting Company (MBC)
 Zuhair Fayez, prominent businessman
 Walid Fitaihi, a physician with dual citizenship of Saudi Arabia and the US and master's degree in public health from Harvard University

Islamic Scholars and Media Figures

Detained 
 Awad al-Qarni, Islamic scholar, author, and former professor
 Ali al-Omari, TV cleric and Chairman of the Mecca Open University
 Salman al-Ouda, Islamic scholar and member of the International Union of Muslim Scholars' board of trustees
 Safar al-Hawali, Islamic scholar, writer and co-founder of the Committee for the Defense of Legitimate Rights
 Ibrahim al-Sakran, Islamic scholar, writer, researcher, lawyer and thinker

Uncertain status 
 Ahmed al-Amari, Islamic scholar and Dean of the Quran College at the Islamic University of Madinah. Died in custody, however there are unconfirmed allegations he was killed.

Reactions
According to Sam Blatteis, Middle East Public Policy Manager for Deloitte and a former Google head of public policy in the Persian Gulf, "This is the closest thing in the Middle East to glasnost"; other businessmen have compared the purge to Russian president Vladimir Putin's politically motivated attacks on Russian oligarchs. The Economist likened the purge to the anti-corruption campaign under Xi Jinping, General Secretary of the Chinese Communist Party. Thomas Friedman at The New York Times called it Saudi Arabia's Arab Spring.

In Saudi Arabia the purge was supported by the Council of Senior Scholars.

Aftermath
The 2017 purge of the Saudi political and business elite was followed in 2018 by arrests of 17 women's rights activists, including Aziza al-Yousef, Loujain al-Hathloul, Eman al-Nafjan, Aisha al-Mana and Madeha al-Ajroush as well as Hatoon al-Fassi, a women's rights activist and associate professor of women's history. Eastern Province human rights activist Israa al-Ghomgham and her husband, already in prison since December 2015, were under legal threat of beheading along with four colleagues, with a final hearing to take place on 28 October 2018 in the Specialized Criminal Court.

On 19 November 2020, some of the Saudi detainees from the night of Ritz-Carlton corruption purge anonymously disclosed details of the torture they endured and coercion by Saudi Arabia. The detainees claim that they were beaten and intimidated by authorities under the supervision of two ministers, who were both close confidantes of the crown prince Mohammed bin Salman who ordered the purge.

Nasser Al Qarni, the son of a prominent Saudi cleric, Awad Al-Qarni, who was arrested during the 2017 purge, was given a warning by the Saudi state security officials from discussing the treatment of his father. Nasser was warned that doing so would lead to his imprisonment or execution. The criticism of the kingdom in Awad’s tweet led to his arrest in 2017. As a result of the threat from the state security, Nasser applied for an asylum and moved to the UK. The allegations made by Nasser concerning state security’s threat for his arrest couldn’t be independently verified by the Bloomberg News so far. The claims were made by the younger Al-Qarni during his interview with Bloomberg News at a central London hotel.

Committee conclusion
On 30 January 2019, the Saudi King Salman reviewed the final report submitted by the committee chairman stating that 381 individuals were ordered and some of them as witnesses. Settlements were made with 87 individual resulting in recovering  $107 billion in the form of real estate, companies, cash, and other assets. The report also stated that Saudi Arabia's Public Prosecutor rejected the settlements with 56 individuals due to already existing criminal charges against them, while eight individuals denied the settlements and were referred to the Public Prosecutor.

See also
Corruption in Saudi Arabia
2017 Lebanon–Saudi Arabia dispute
2018–2019 Saudi crackdown on feminists
2019 Saudi Arabia mass execution

References

2017 in law
Purge
Anti-corruption measures
Corruption in Asia
Law enforcement in Saudi Arabia
Political history of Saudi Arabia
November 2017 events in Saudi Arabia
2017 purge
2017 purge
Political and cultural purges
2017 purge